This is a summary of 1958 in music in the United Kingdom, including the official charts from that year.

Events
24 January – Paul McCartney makes his first appearance at The Cavern Club in Liverpool with The Quarrymen.
5 February – Michael Tippett's Symphony No. 2 is first performed in London.
12 March – The UK has not entered the third annual Eurovision Song Contest, after coming 7th previous year. It is the second of the only two occasions in the contest's history that the UK fails to enter.
1 April – BBC Radiophonic Workshop created.
2 April – Ralph Vaughan Williams's Symphony No. 9 is premiered in London by the Royal Philharmonic Orchestra conducted by Malcolm Sargent.
10 April – Singer Cleo Laine and bandleader John Dankworth marry.
19 April – The Marquee Club first opens in London, as a jazz venue.
July – Pete Seeger begins performing his new song "The Bells of Rhymney", based on a lyric by Welsh poet Idris Davies.
29 August – "Move It", the debut record by Cliff Richard and the Drifters, is released, reaching number 2 on the UK Singles Chart. It is credited with being one of the first authentic rock and roll songs produced outside the United States.
 2–9 December – Decca makes the first complete recording of Peter Grimes, conducted by the composer Benjamin Britten.

Charts
See UK No.1 Hits of 1958

Classical music: new works
William Alwyn – Fanfare for a Joyful Occasion, for orchestra
Malcolm Arnold – Sinfonietta No. 2, for orchestra, Op. 65
Lennox Berkeley 
Concerto, for piano and double string orchestra, Op. 46
Poems of W.H. Auden (5), for soprano or tenor and piano, Op. 53
Ronald Binge – "The Watermill"
Arthur Bliss – The Lady of Shallott (ballet)
Cornelius Cardew – Piano Sonata No. 3
Daniel Jones – The Country Beyond the Stars (cantata)
Peter Maxwell Davies – Prolation, for orchestra
Peter Racine Fricker - A Vision of Judgement (chorus and orchestra)
Thea Musgrave – String Quartet
Edmund Rubbra – Violin Concerto
Ian Parrott – Concerto for English horn (cor anglais) and orchestra
Humphrey Searle - Symphony No 2
Michael Tippett - Symphony No 2
William Walton - Partita for orchestra
Ralph Vaughan Williams – Symphony No. 9
Grace Williams – Six Poems by Gerard Manley Hopkins for contralto and string sextet

Opera
Benjamin Britten – Noye's Fludde
Humphrey Searle – The Diary of a Madman

Film and Incidental music
Richard Addinsell – A Tale of Two Cities, starring Dirk Bogarde and Dorothy Tutin.
John Addison – I Was Monty's Double.
William Alwyn – A Night to Remember directed by Roy Ward Baker.
Malcolm Arnold – Dunkirk, starring John Mills, Richard Attenborough and Bernard Lee.
James Bernard – Dracula directed by Terence Fisher, starring Christopher Lee and Peter Cushing.
Buxton Orr – Corridors of Blood, starring Boris Karloff and Christopher Lee.
Leonard Salzedo – The Revenge of Frankenstein directed by Terence Fisher, starring Peter Cushing.

Musical theatre
Expresso Bongo, book by Wolf Mankowitz and Julian More, with music by David Heneker and Monty Norman
Valmouth, by Sandy Wilson, based on the novel by Ronald Firbank

Musical films
The Duke Wore Jeans, starring Tommy Steele
The Golden Disc, starring Lee Patterson and Terry Dene

Births
 8 January – Steve Garvey, bass guitarist (Buzzcocks)
 24 January – Jools Holland, pianist, bandleader and television presenter
 21 February – Jake Burns, punk singer
 23 February – David Sylvian, vocalist (Japan)
 24 February - Mike Pickering, keyboardist (M People)
 1 March – Nik Kershaw, singer-songwriter
 5 March – Andy Gibb, English-born singer (died 1988)
 8 March – Gary Numan, British singer
 9 March – Martin Fry, vocalist of ABC
 18 March – Neil Brand, British writer, pianist and composer
 11 April – Stuart Adamson (Big Country) (d. 2001)
 12 April – Will Sergeant, guitarist (Echo & the Bunnymen)
 15 April – Benjamin Zephaniah, writer and musician
 25 April – Fish, Scottish singer
 17 May – Alan Rankine, musician and producer
 18 May – Toyah Willcox, actress and singer
 25 May – Paul Weller, singer-songwriter
 11 June – Barry Adamson, singer and bass player 
 14 June - Nick Van Eede, Singer/Songwriter, vocalist (Cutting Crew)
 29 June – Mark Radcliffe, singer and radio host
 5 July – Paul Daniel, conductor
 20 July – Mick MacNeil, Scottish keyboard player and songwriter (Simple Minds)
 30 July – Kate Bush, singer and songwriter
 4 August – Ian Broudie, singer-songwriter, guitarist, and producer 
 7 August – Bruce Dickinson, musician
 13 August – Feargal Sharkey, singer (The Undertones)
 6 September – Buster Bloodvessel, vocalist (Bad Manners)
 10 September – Siobhan Fahey, singer
 21 September – Simon Mayo, radio presenter
 14 October – Thomas Dolby, musician
20 October – Mark King, guitarist and singer
27 October – Simon Le Bon, singer (Duran Duran)
10 December – Helen DeMacque, singer (Pepsi & Shirlie)
19 December – Limahl, singer

Deaths
11 January – Alec Rowley, English organist and composer (born 1892)
2 April – Tudor Davies, operatic tenor (born 1892)
14 April – Katharine Goodson, pianist (born 1872)
3 May – Roland Cunningham, Australian-born British singer and actor (born 1872) 
5 August – Joseph Holbrooke, composer (born 1878)
26 August – Ralph Vaughan Williams, British composer (born 1872)
2 September – Betty Humby Beecham, pianist (born 1908) 
24 October – Martin Shaw, composer (born 1875)
27 October – John Wooldridge, film composer (born 1919) (car accident)
2 November – Adam Carse, composer (born 1878)
3 November – Harry Revel, musical theatre composer (b. 1905)
6 November – Francis George Scott, composer (born 1880)
28 December – Reginald Foresythe, jazz pianist, arranger, composer, and bandleader (born 1907)
date unknown – John Strachan, ballad singer (born 1875)

See also 
 1958 in British television
 1958 in the United Kingdom
 List of British films of 1958

References 

 
British Music, 1958 In
British music by year